Dean Fleischer Camp is an American film director, film producer, screenwriter and film editor. He created the Marcel the Shell with Shoes On short films with Jenny Slate, whom he was married to from 2012 to 2016. He also directed and starred in the feature film of the same name, which he co-wrote with Slate and Nick Paley. For their work in the feature film, Fleischer Camp and Paley were nominated for the Independent Spirit Award for Best Editing at the 38th Independent Spirit Awards. Camp was also nominated for the Academy Award for Best Animated Feature at the 95th Academy Awards. He also directed the 2016 documentary Fraud.

In July 2022, it was announced that Fleischer Camp has been hired to direct a live-action remake of Lilo & Stitch for Disney.

Early life
He is a graduate of the New York University Tisch School of the Arts.  He grew up in Henrico County, Virginia and graduated from Douglas S. Freeman High School.

Filmography

Notes

References

External links
 

Living people
21st-century American screenwriters
American male screenwriters
American film directors
Screenwriters from Virginia
New York University alumni
Film producers from Virginia
American film editors
People from Henrico County, Virginia
Year of birth missing (living people)
Collage filmmakers
Annie Award winners